George Murdoch (April 29, 1850 – February 2, 1910) was a Canadian politician, Alberta pioneer, saddle-maker, and the first mayor of Calgary, Alberta.

Early life
George Murdoch was born in Paisley, Scotland, on April 29, 1850, and at the age of four, Murdoch emigrated to Canada in 1854 and settled in Saint John, New Brunswick, where he spent much of his earlier years. At the age of 18 Murdoch moved to Chicago, where he learned the trade of saddle and harness making. Murdoch returned to New Brunswick after his shop was destroyed in the 1871 Great Chicago Fire. While in New Brunswick he married his wife Margaret, and together they had their first two children in the province.  In total, they had at least three sons and two daughters.

Move to Calgary
On May 13, 1883, George Murdoch arrived in Calgary at the age of 33, just months before the Canadian Pacific Railway would reach the community in August 1883. In Calgary, he started a successful harness shop.  As Calgary was at its early stages, his main clientele was the North-West Mounted Police based in Fort Calgary and Blackfoot Indians who had a reserve nearby.  He was on good terms with the Blackfoot and had learned to speak their language.

In the community, Murdoch was involved with the Masonic Lodge and the Orange Order in Canada, literary and history societies, volunteer fire brigade, was one of the founders of Calgary's Presbyterian Church and the first President of the Calgary St. Andrew's Society.  Being one of the first permanent businessmen in Calgary, he was an active participant in securing the incorporation of Calgary from the government of the North-West Territories in November 1884.

Municipal Politics
George Murdoch played a pivotal role in the formation of the Town of Calgary, joining prominent civic leaders as elected members of the seven-person civic committee, the precursor to the first town council. The elected group consisted of Murdoch, Major James Walker (1846-1936), Dr. Andrew Henderson, George Clift King, Thomas Swan, J. D. Moulton and Captain John Stewart (d. 1893).

On December 4, 1884, Murdoch was elected the first mayor of the Town of Calgary and was re-elected on January 4, 1886, holding the post until October 21, 1886. Murdoch, along with councillors Issac Sanford Freeze and Dr. Neville James Lindsay, was removed from office effective October 21, 1886, by a special Territorial Ordinance issued by stipendiary magistrate Jeremiah Travis.

January 1886 Calgary Municipal Election
Travis, a teetotaler and supporter of the temperance movement, was appalled by the open traffic of liquor, gambling and prostitution in Calgary despite legal prohibition in the Northwest Territories. Murdoch and the town solicitor Henry Bleeker were alleged to be members of a whisky ring, and rumors were rampant that both Murdoch and the town's police chief James Ingram was receiving kickbacks from brothels and saloon keepers. Travis's behavior soon reached Ottawa and Judge Thomas Wardlaw Taylor of Winnipeg was sent by the federal government to investigate the situation. Taylor's report "Precis of the case of Jeremiah Travis (late stipendiary magistrate at Calgary) as presented by the report of Mr. Justice Taylor and the correspondence and evidence" which found Travis had exceeded his authority was released much later, in June 1887.

Shortly before the 1886 election, G. E. Marsh brought a charge of corruption against Murdoch and council over irregularities in the voters' list. Travis found Murdoch and the councillors guilty, disqualifying them from running in the 1886 election, barring them from municipal office for two years, and fining Murdoch $100, and the councillors $20. Taylor notes Council added about 78 names to the voter list without notice of sworn testimony, but the names added appeared to have the qualifications necessary to be entitled to be on the voters list. Taylor found treating the actions of council as a case of personal corruption was erroneous in law and irregular in form. Furthermore Taylor noted the punishment of removal from office, disqualification from re-election for two years and fines "extreme". Taylor also notes when the voters' list was being revised and the "corrupt practices" were occurring, Murdoch was visiting his former home in Eastern Canada and not in Calgary.

The election occurred as planned in on January 6, 1886, with Murdoch and the councillors on the ballot and the "irregular voter list" in use. Travis served the Returning Officer with a judicial order forbidding him from receiving any vote for Murdoch which would have the effect of showing Murdoch's opponents having received a majority of the vote. The returning officer ignored Travis's order as there was no authority for it to be issued. The final result of the election showed Murdoch with a majority 180 votes and his opponent James Reilly with 18. Of the 78 names irregularly added to the voters' list, only 41 votes were cast.

Travis found Murdoch in contempt of court and disallowed the result of the election, instead installing James Reilly as mayor and other members as the council. The municipal government under Mayor Reilly was ineffective when the town's books and seal disappeared.

The federal government acted before officially receiving Taylor's report by reorganized the courts of the Northwest Territories, and the Territorial Council called for a new municipal election in Calgary on November 3, 1886.  George Clift King was elected Mayor of Calgary.

Later Municipal Politics
Murdoch was elected town Councillor for single terms in both 1889 and 1895.

During the Calgary Fire of 1886 it was determined a firebreak would need to be formed, and former mayor George Murdoch agreed and participated in the demolishing of his harness shop. An attempt was made to use gunpowder to blow up Murdoch's store. However, the Calgary Weekly Herald noted "failed owing to the force of the charge not being sufficiently concentrated". The fire was stopped and the extinguished after the break was created.

Later life
In later life Murdoch suffered from paralysis, and died in Calgary on February 2, 1910.

Citations

References

External links
 
 Precis of the Case of Jeremiah Travis (Late Stipendiary Magistrate at Calgary) As Presented By the Report of Mr. Justice Taylor and the Correspondence and Evidence

Mayors of Calgary
Scottish emigrants to pre-Confederation New Brunswick
1850 births
1910 deaths
Politicians from Paisley, Renfrewshire
British emigrants to Canada
Calgary city councillors
19th-century Canadian politicians